Cupar in Fife was a royal burgh that returned one commissioner to the Parliament of Scotland and to the Convention of Estates.

After the Acts of Union 1707, Cupar, Dundee, Forfar, Perth and St Andrews formed the Perth district of burghs, returning one member between them to the House of Commons of Great Britain.

List of burgh commissioners

 1661: George Turnbull, bailie (died 1662) 
 1662–63: Andrew Paterson 
 1665 convention, 1667 convention: Andrew Paterson of Kilmeny 
 1669–72: John Barclay, dean of guild
 1678 convention: George Manson, bailie 
 1681–82: Patrick Mortimer, bailie 
 1685–86: Andre Glasford, bailie 
 1689 convention, 1689–90: Robert Melville of Carskeirdoe (died c. 1690) 
 1693–1702: Sir Archibald Muir of Thorntown  
 1702–07: Patrick Bruce of Banzion

See also
 List of constituencies in the Parliament of Scotland at the time of the Union

References

Constituencies of the Parliament of Scotland (to 1707)
Politics of Fife
History of Fife
Constituencies disestablished in 1707
1707 disestablishments in Scotland